WJJO (94.1 FM, "94-1 JJO") is a radio station broadcasting from Madison, Wisconsin, licensed to Watertown. It describes itself as having an "active rock" format, targeting adults 18 to 49. WJJO is considered one of the hardest active rock radio stations in the country, and was voted #1 Rock Station in the country by the music industry in 2006 and 2007 and was the recipient of the Radio Contraband Rock Radio Award for Medium Market Radio Station of the year in 2011, 2012, 2013 and 2014. WJJO was inducted to the Rock Radio Hall of Fame in 2014. The station is owned by Mid-West Management, Inc.

Its morning show was hosted by Johnny Danger and Greg Bair for many years. On December 22, 2006 Greg Bair left to host mornings on Mid-West's WHLK "The Lake."  On Monday, November 3, 2008, Greg Bair returned to WJJO to co-host the morning show until August 30, 2019 when his last show with Johnny Danger aired. The morning show is currently hosted by Johnny Danger and Dee.  Previous morning show hosts include Sue Peterson, Mark Elliot, and "Crash and Burns".

History

Early years (1961-1982) 
WJJO began broadcasting in Watertown, Wisconsin in 1961 at 104.7 MHz as WTTN-FM, moving to 94.1 in the early 1970s to allow WTKM in Hartford, Wisconsin to apply for an FM license to broadcast on 104.9. WTTN-FM and its AM sister station WTTN at 1580 kHz, simulcast programming from 1961 until 1982.

Adult contemporary (1982-1989) 
In 1982, the FM started broadcasting in stereo and became WMLW ("Mellow 94") and broadcast a soft adult-contemporary music format. WMLW also broadcast Milwaukee Brewers baseball games and syndicated programming such as The Rockin' America Top 30 Countdown with Scott Shannon and Westwood One's That's Love in the 1980s.

Top 40 (1989-1991) 
In 1989, with a change in ownership to Joyner Communications, the station adopted a Top 40 format as 94.1 WTFX "The Fox" and moved its studios to Madison, Wisconsin and its transmitter location to Deerfield, Wisconsin where it remains today. Joyner later sold the station to the current owner, Mid-West Family broadcasting.

Classic rock (1991-1997) 
On June 17, 1991, the call letters were changed to WJJO and a classic rock format was adopted.

Active rock (1997-present) 
On April 1, 1997, WJJO switched to its current format of Active Rock.

Awards
In June 2013, Michele Clark's  Sunset Sessions convention awarded WJJO the "rock station who plays the most new music".

References

External links
WJJO-FM official website
WJJO 94.1 FM
Mid-West Family Broadcasting: WJJO
Ont The Radio: WJJO
RadioTime: WJJO
The Daily Page: Discusses controversial payments and contest prizes at WJJO.

JJO
Active rock radio stations in the United States
Radio stations established in 1961